Shimoyama Station (下山駅) is the name of two train stations in Japan:

 Shimoyama Station (Kochi)
 Shimoyama Station (Kyoto)